Vladimir Tuychiev (born 23 March 1983) is a Uzbekistani road and track cyclist. He competed 2007, 2011, 2012 and 2013 UCI Track Cycling World Championships. On the road he competed in the time trial at the 2007 UCI Road World Championships and 2008 UCI Road World Championships.

Major results

Road

2002
 2nd Road race, National Road Championships
2004
 3rd Time trial, National Road Championships
 7th Time trial, Asian Cycling Championships
2005
 2nd Time trial, National Road Championships
 3rd  Time trial, Asian Cycling Championships
 8th Overall Tour de Korea
2006
 3rd Road race, National Road Championships
 9th Time trial, Asian Games
2007
 National Road Championships
1st  Time trial
3rd Road race
 2nd Trofeo Città di Castelfidardo
 Asian Cycling Championships
3rd  Time trial
4th Road race
 7th Road race, UCI B World Championships
 7th Overall Tour of South China Sea
 10th Ruota d'Oro
2008
 National Road Championships
1st  Time trial
3rd Road race
 10th Memorial Davide Fardelli
 10th Gran Premio San Giuseppe
2009
 National Road Championships
1st  Time trial
2nd Road race
 Asian Cycling Championships
6th Road race
10th Time trial
 8th Overall Perlis Open
1st Stage 3
2011
 1st Golan I
 2nd Golan II
 3rd Road race, National Road Championships
2013
 2nd Time trial, National Road Championships
 10th Overall Sharjah International Cycling Tour
2014
 2nd Time trial, National Road Championships
2016
 3rd Time trial, National Road Championships

Track
2006
 2nd  Points race, Asian Games
2009
 Asian Championships
1st  Points race
2nd  Individual pursuit
2010
 1st  Points race, Asian Games
2012
 3rd  Individual pursuit, Asian Championships

References

External links
 
 
 
 
 

1983 births
Living people
Uzbekistani track cyclists
Uzbekistani male cyclists
Place of birth missing (living people)
Asian Games medalists in cycling
Cyclists at the 2006 Asian Games
Cyclists at the 2010 Asian Games
Cyclists at the 2014 Asian Games
Medalists at the 2006 Asian Games
Medalists at the 2010 Asian Games
Asian Games gold medalists for Uzbekistan
Asian Games silver medalists for Uzbekistan
21st-century Uzbekistani people